Edwin Milton Abbott (June 4, 1877 – November 8, 1940) was an American lawyer and poet, born in Philadelphia and educated at Central High School and the University of Pennsylvania. He was admitted to the bar in 1896 and subsequently distinguished himself in criminal cases.  He was chief counsel in the fight of the Philadelphia commuters against the railroads, a member of the Pennsylvania House of Representatives, 1911–12, chairman of the Commission on the Revision of Criminal Laws in the State of Pennsylvania, 1912–15 and 1917–23, and in 1913 minority nominee for judge of the Court of Common Pleas.  He was appointed as secretary of the American Institute of Criminal Law and Criminology in 1913.

Abbott was the author of Thoughts in Verse (1922) and The Law and Religion (1938).

References
Notes

Bibliography
  Amazon.com author listing
 EDWIN M. ABBOTT, LAWYER 45 YEARS; Ex-Assistant City Solicitor of Philadelphia, Admitted to Bar at 18, Dies in Abington, Pa. EX-AIDE OF GEN. BUTLER Poet and Author, Long a Timer at Penn Relays, Had Served in the State Legislature  (subscription required)
 Edwin M. Abbot, Pennsylvania House of Representatives
  Edwin Abbott biography
  Lyricist for "Again"
 

Poets from Pennsylvania
Lawyers from Philadelphia
University of Pennsylvania alumni
1877 births
1940 deaths
Members of the Pennsylvania House of Representatives
Central High School (Philadelphia) alumni